Hans Reck (born 31 March 1934) is a German weightlifter. He competed in the men's bantamweight event at the 1960 Summer Olympics.

References

External links
 

1934 births
Living people
German male weightlifters
Olympic weightlifters of the United Team of Germany
Weightlifters at the 1960 Summer Olympics
People from Bautzen (district)
Sportspeople from Saxony